The 2016 season for the  cycling team began in February at the Dubai Tour. Bardiani–CSF is an Italian-registered UCI Professional Continental cycling team that participated in road bicycle racing events on the UCI Continental Circuits and when selected as a wildcard to UCI WorldTour events.

2016 roster

Riders who joined the team for the 2016 season

Riders who left the team during or after the 2015 season

Season victories

References

External links
 

2016 road cycling season by team
2016 in Italian sport